Missing Persons is an American crime drama television series, set in Chicago. It followed a fictitious missing persons unit; each episode usually following the investigation into three or more cases. It ran on ABC from August 30, 1993 to February 17, 1994.

It was produced by Gary Sherman Productions in association with Stephen J. Cannell Productions, and often used local Chicago-based actors, as well as occasional guest stars such as Nina Foch, Eddie Bracken, and Lois Smith. Semi-regulars included Ian Gomez, Irma P. Hall, Laura Cerón and Valerie Harper. Unlike most series from Cannell's company, he did not create or co-create this series.

Regular cast
Daniel J. Travanti: Lieutenant who heads the Missing Persons Unit, Ray McAuliffe
Erik King: Missing Persons Unit Investigator, Bobby Davison
Juan Ramírez: Missing Persons Unit Sergeant, Carlos Marrone
Frederick Weller: Missing Persons Unit Investigator, Johnny Sandowski
Jorja Fox: Missing Persons Unit Police Officer, Connie Karadzic
Robert Swan: Missing Persons Unit Secretary, Dan Manaher
Paty Lombard: Wife of Ray McAuliffe, Barbara McAuliffe
Al Hoffman: core-group, detective, Justin McCarthy (un-credited)
Among the guest stars was Stephen Colbert in episode 2.

Episodes

Home media
On July 27, 2010, Mill Creek Entertainment released Prime Time Crime: The Stephen J. Cannell Collection on DVD in Region 1. This special collection contains 54 episodes from 13 different shows produced by Stephen J. Cannell Productions, including all episodes of Missing Persons.

References

External links
 

American Broadcasting Company original programming
1993 American television series debuts
1994 American television series endings
1990s American crime drama television series
Television shows set in Chicago
Television series by Stephen J. Cannell Productions